RX2 or variant may refer to:

 Mazda RX-2 midsized car
 .rx2 file format
 RX II sailing yacht
 Lublin R-XII airplane
 RX2 minor planet notation
 1983 RX2, see 4199 Andreev
 1985 RX2, see (20993) 1985 RX2
 1986 RX2, see 7925 Shelus
 1991 RX2, see 6157 Prey
 RX-2, a character from Garfield
 RX2, a product from iZotope
 RX-2, a grand piano from Kawai (company)
 RX2, the differential from the Renault Captur
 RX02, a pharmaceutical from Rib-X Pharmaceuticals
 DEC RX02, 8"-floppy system, see List of floppy disk formats
 RX2, FIA rallycross racing category